Geoffrey Wooding (February 20, 1954 – January 26, 2010) was a Boston architect who mainly designed mixed-income housing and college dormitories. He was also one of the authors of Building Type Basics for Housing a book documenting good housing design and conventions. Wooding was part of the American Institute of Architects, LEED certified, and a principal of Goody, Clancy & Associates, Inc of Boston.

References

Architects from Boston
1954 births
2010 deaths